Thomas "Tommy T" Gobena (born 1971) is the bassist for Gypsy punk band Gogol Bordello. He is of Ethiopian descent and was born in Addis Ababa, the capital of Ethiopia. He moved to Washington D.C. in 1987 at the age of 16 and joined Gogol Bordello in 2006. Aside from his work with Gogol Bordello, he also has released one solo album titled The Prester John Sessions.

References

External links
Thomas Gobena talks with Gina Ponce in Gogol Bordello: nthWORD Exclusive nthWORD Magazine
www.thomasgobena.com Thomas Gobena's official website.

Ethiopian musicians
Punk rock bass guitarists
People from Addis Ababa
1971 births
Living people
Gogol Bordello members
Easy Star Records artists
21st-century bass guitarists
Oromo people